Michael Harforth (born 9 February 1959) is a retired German footballer who played with Karlsruher SC, Freiburger FC, SV Wiesbaden, MSV Duisburg, Hannover 96, SG Egelsbach and SV Darmstadt 98.

References

External links
 

1959 births
Living people
German footballers
Association football midfielders
Karlsruher SC players
MSV Duisburg players
Hannover 96 players
Bundesliga players
2. Bundesliga players
Freiburger FC players